Valentin Daniel Preisler or Preissler (born on 18 April 1717 in Nuremberg and deceased there on 8 April 1765) was a German engraver.

Biography 
Valentin Daniel Preisler was the youngest son of the painter Johann Daniel Preisler and his wife Felicitas Riedner (deceased in 1743). He became a pupil of Bernhard Vogel, and later, for two years, of his brother Johan Martin Preisler in Copenhagen. After the death of Vogel, he finished the engraved edition of the paintings of Jan Kupecký, initially started by Vogel, and published in Nuremberg in 1745. He was a refined artist who left many works. He is among others remembered for his portraits of famous composers such as Georg Philipp Telemann, Carl Heinrich Graun, Johan Agrell and Ignazio Fiorillo. Valentin Daniel Preisler was married to Anna Sophie Volland.

Bibliography 

 (de) Leitschuh, Franz Friedrich, « Preisler, Valentin Daniel », in: Allgemeine Deutsche Biographie, tome 26, Leipzig : Duncker & Humblot, 1888, page 551 et suiv.
 (de) Bosl, Karl, Bayerische Biografie, Regensburg, 1983, page 601.
 (de) Preisler, Bertel, Slægten Preisler, 1984.
 (de) Will, Georg Andreas, Nürnbergisches Gelehrten-Lexikon, As supplemented by Christian Conrad Nopitsch (8 volumes), published 1755-1802.

References 

1717 births
1765 deaths
German engravers
Artists from Nuremberg